Irene McGugan (born 1952) is a Scottish politician. She was a Scottish National Party (SNP) Member of the Scottish Parliament (MSP) for North East Scotland region from 1999 to 2003.

In the 1999 election she stood as a constituency candidate in Aberdeen South, finishing fourth. However her number four position on the SNP North East Scotland list was enough to take her to Holyrood. She was the SNP's deputy party spokesperson on Education and Young People from June 2001, replacing John Swinney who became party leader.

She contested the seat of Dundee West in the 2003 election, where she narrowly lost to the Labour incumbent Kate Maclean.

References

External links 
 

1952 births
Living people
People from Angus, Scotland
Scottish National Party MSPs
Members of the Scottish Parliament 1999–2003
Female members of the Scottish Parliament
20th-century Scottish women politicians